Jennifer Andison (born 1971) is a Canadian Anglican cleric. She was suffragan bishop of the York-Credit Valley episcopal area in the Diocese of Toronto from 2017 to 2021. She is currently the incumbent of St. Paul's, Bloor Street, the largest Anglican church in Toronto.

Biography
Andison was born in 1971 in the United Kingdom. Her parents were medical missionaries with the Church Mission Society, she spent formative years in Pakistan and the family emigrated to Canada when she was 11. She has lived in Pakistan, India, Singapore and Japan.

She was educated at Queen's University and graduated from Wycliffe College, University of Toronto, with a Masters of Divinity in 1997. She was ordained in the Anglican Church of Canada in 1999. 

Andison served as deacon at St. Alban's, Tokyo, in 1998;  assistant curate at St. Timothy's, Agincourt, from 1999–2001; associate vicar at St. James's, Clerkenwell, from 2001–2005; associate priest at St. Paul's, Bloor Street from 2006–2013; and incumbent at St. Clement's, Eglinton, from 2013–2017. 

On September 17, 2016, Andison was elected as a suffragan bishop, alongside Kevin Robertson and Riscylla Shaw. She was consecrated on January 7, 2017, by Colin Johnson, Bishop of Toronto, and Fred Hiltz, Primate of the Anglican Church of Canada, at St. Paul's, Bloor Street. Johnson appointed her to the York-Credit Valley episcopal area. In October 2020, she announced her intention to step down as bishop in early 2021 and become the incumbent of St. Paul's, Bloor Street. She has retained the title of bishop and the style The Right Reverend. 

Jenny Andison is married to Tim, a corporate lawyer, and they have three daughters, Emma, Kate and Charlotte.

References

External links
 Installation as Bishop
 Meeting Bishop Jenny Andison

1972 births
Living people
Queen's University at Kingston alumni
University of Toronto alumni
Anglican bishops of Toronto
21st-century Anglican Church of Canada bishops